The men's 10 metre running target competition at the 2004 Summer Olympics was held on 18 and 19 August at the Markópoulo Olympic Shooting Centre near Athens, Greece. Along with the women's double trap, this was the last Olympic competition in the event, before being removed from the program shortly after the Games.

The event consisted of two rounds: a qualifier and a final. In the qualifier, each shooter fired 60 shots with a running target at 10 metres distance.  Scores for each shot were in increments of 1, with a maximum score of 10. The first 30 shots were in the slow-running stage, with series of 30 runs being shot within 5 seconds. The second set of 30 runs gave shooters 2.5 seconds to take each shot.

The top 6 shooters in the qualifying round moved on to the final round. There, they fired an additional 20 shots. These shots scored in increments of .1, with a maximum score of 10.9. They were fired in four series of 5 fast-running shots. 

Despite a poor performance in the final, Germany's Manfred Kurzer held off a strenuous challenge from the Russian duo Aleksandr Blinov and 2002 World champion Dimitri Lykin to capture the gold medal with 682.4 points in a historic running target finale. Earlier, Kurzer set a new world record of 590, which had been added to the final score for an overall total, to grab a top seed in the prelims, augmenting two points from a global standard set by China's double Olympic champion Yang Ling in 2002. Meanwhile, Blinov took the silver at 678.0, while his fellow marksman Lykin locked the medal haul for the Russians in a 2–3 finish with a bronze-medal score of 677.1.

Records
Prior to this competition, the existing world and Olympic records were as follows.

Qualification round

Final

References

External links
Official Results

Men's 10 m Running Target
Men's events at the 2004 Summer Olympics